Ken Gillard (born 30 April 1972) is an Irish former professional footballer who  played as a left back. He is currently a youth team coach at Arsenal.

Playing career 
Born in Dublin, He started his career as a youth player at Luton Town but failed to make a first team appearance. He then joined Northampton Town, where he made 23 appearances in the Football League. After leaving Northampton he played for non-League sides Chesham United and Hitchin Town.

Coaching career 
He joined Nuneaton as assistant manager to his former Northampton teammate Kevin Wilkin in 2008. He had previously held similar roles at Barton Rovers and Hitchin Town.

International career 
Gillard played for the Republic of Ireland under-21 side during the early 1990s.

References 

1972 births
Living people
Republic of Ireland association footballers
Association footballers from Dublin (city)
Association football fullbacks
Belvedere F.C. players
Luton Town F.C. players
Northampton Town F.C. players
Hitchin Town F.C. players
Chesham United F.C. players
English Football League players
Republic of Ireland under-21 international footballers
Crystal Palace F.C. non-playing staff
Arsenal F.C. non-playing staff